Patrick S. Gallagher (born October 6, 1992) is an American professional sports car racing and stock car racing driver. He last competed part-time in the NASCAR Xfinity Series, driving the Nos. 28 and 38 Ford Mustangs for RSS Racing.

Racing career

Sports car racing

NASCAR
Gallagher made his NASCAR Xfinity Series debut at Mid-Ohio Sports Car Course. He started 37th in the No. 99 B. J. McLeod Motorsports Chevrolet and finished 23rd. He would return to the NASCAR and the Xfinity Series to run the race at Circuit of the Americas in 2022, driving the No. 28 for RSS Racing.

Motorsports career results

SCCA National Championship Runoffs

American Open-Wheel racing results
(key) (Races in bold indicate pole position, races in italics indicate fastest race lap)

SCCA Pro Formula Enterprises

U.S. F2000 National Championship

Complete WeatherTech SportsCar Championship results
(key) (Races in bold indicate pole position; results in italics indicate fastest lap)

NASCAR
(key) (Bold – Pole position awarded by qualifying time. Italics – Pole position earned by points standings or practice time. * – Most laps led.)

Xfinity Series

References

External links
 

1992 births
Living people
NASCAR drivers
Racing drivers from Ohio
SCCA National Championship Runoffs winners
U.S. F2000 National Championship drivers
Michelin Pilot Challenge drivers
WeatherTech SportsCar Championship drivers